John Jasiel Perry (August 2, 1811 – May 2, 1897) was a U.S. Representative from Maine.

Born in Portsmouth, New Hampshire, Perry moved with his parents to Hebron (now Oxford), Maine, in 1812. He attended the common schools and Maine Wesleyan Seminary.  During one of his school terms in Hebron his teacher was future President Franklin Pierce.  He became deputy sheriff of Oxford County and served as member of the Maine House of Representatives in 1840, 1842, 1843, and 1872. He studied law and was admitted to the bar in 1844, commencing practice in Oxford. He served as member of the Maine State Senate in 1846 and 1847 and as clerk of the Maine House of Representatives in 1854.

Perry was elected as an Opposition Party candidate to the 34th Congress (March 4, 1855 – March 3, 1857). He was not a candidate for renomination in 1856. He was then elected as a Republican to the 36th Congress (March 4, 1859 – March 3, 1861). He was not a candidate for renomination in 1860. He served as member of the Peace Conference of 1861, which was held in an effort to prevent the start of the American Civil War.

He was editor of the Oxford Democrat from 1860 to 1875 and extensively connected with newspapers, both in and out of the state, as correspondent. He served as member of the state executive council in 1866 and 1867. He moved to Portland, Maine, in 1875 and engaged in the practice of his profession until his death in that city on May 2, 1897. He was interred in Evergreen Cemetery.

References

External links 
 

1811 births
1897 deaths
Politicians from Portsmouth, New Hampshire
Opposition Party members of the United States House of Representatives from Maine
Republican Party members of the United States House of Representatives from Maine
Republican Party members of the Maine House of Representatives
Republican Party Maine state senators
People from Oxford, Maine
Maine sheriffs
Burials at Evergreen Cemetery (Portland, Maine)
19th-century American politicians